David Michael Hollins (born 4 February 1938) is a Welsh former footballer who played at both professional and international levels as a goalkeeper.

Personal life
Hollins was born in Bangor, Wales. He is the older brother of former England international footballer John Hollins, and the uncle of TV presenter Chris Hollins. Following the end of his playing career he became a painter and decorator, and later lived in Guildford.

Career

Professional career
Hollins began his career with local non-league side Merrow, and played in the English Football League for Brighton & Hove Albion, Newcastle United and Mansfield Town. He was loaned to Nottingham Forest, in an emergency exchange for Duncan McKenzie, when Forest keeper Alan Hill broke an arm. He went on to play for Aldershot, making a total of 314 league appearances. He also played non-league football for Romford.

International career
Hollins earned 11 caps for Wales between 1962 and 1966.

References

1938 births
Living people
Welsh footballers
Wales international footballers
Wales under-23 international footballers
Brighton & Hove Albion F.C. players
Newcastle United F.C. players
Mansfield Town F.C. players
Nottingham Forest F.C. players
Aldershot F.C. players
English Football League players
Association football goalkeepers